Grand River may refer to:


Rivers

Canada
 Grand River, Nova Scotia
 Grand River (Ontario)
 Grand River Raceway, Elora, Ontario
 Ottawa River, formerly known as Grand River
 Churchill River (Atlantic), formerly known as Grand River
 Grand River Airport, Grand River, Prince Edward Island, Canada

United States
 Grand River (Colorado), historical name (1836-1921) of the Colorado River above the confluence with the Green River 
 Grand River (Michigan)
 Grand River (Ohio)
 Grand River (Oklahoma)
 Grand River (Missouri) in Iowa and Missouri
 Grand River (Oklahoma)
 Grand River (South Dakota) in North and South Dakota
 Grand River, tributary of Fox River, Wisconsin

Populated places

United States
 Grand River, Iowa
 Grand River, Ohio
 Grand River Township, Adair County, Iowa
 Grand River Township, Decatur County, Iowa
 Grand River Township, Madison County, Iowa
 Grand River Township, Wayne County, Iowa
 Grand River Township, Sedgwick County, Kansas
 Grand River Township, Bates County, Missouri
 Grand River Township, Cass County, Missouri
 Grand River Township, Daviess County, Missouri
 Grand River Township, DeKalb County, Missouri
 Grand River Township, Bowman County, North Dakota
 Grand Rivers, Kentucky

Mauritius
 Grand River, Mauritius

Other uses
 Grand River Avenue, part of U.S. Route 16 in Michigan, U.S.
 Grand River Collegiate Institute, in Kitchener, Ontario, Canada

See also

Grande-Rivière (disambiguation)
Great River (disambiguation)
Big River (disambiguation)
Grand River Valley (disambiguation)
 Rio Grande (Spanish, 'Grand River')